Hind Mazdoor Kisan Panchayat (India Workers Peasants Council), is a national trade union confederation in India. Its national president is George Fernandes.

Literature 

 Jaya Jaitly: "Organizing the Unorganised in Kerala" in: Economic and Political Weekly, Vol. 32, No. 28 (12-18 Jul. 1997), pp. 1729–1736.

Trade unions in India